Argentina competed at the 2006 Winter Olympics in Turin, Italy.

Alpine skiing 

Of the five-person alpine skiing contingent Argentina sent to Turin, three were members of the Simari Birkner family. These three accounted for all of Argentina's top-30 finishes, with the best performances coming from Cristian Javier in the giant slalom and the combined.

Note: In the men's combined, runs 1 is the downhill, and runs 2 and 3 are the slalom. In the women's combined, run 1 and 2 are the slalom, and run 3 the downhill.

Biathlon 

Beltrame's best finish came in the individual event, where he finished 84th ahead of three other finishers.

Cross-country skiing 

Distance

Freestyle skiing 

44-year-old Colorado resident Clyde Getty represented Argentina in the men's aerials, finishing last in the field after failing to land his second jump.

Luge 

Michelle Despain bumped into the track walls several times during the competition, and was nearly 10 seconds slower than the next-to-last finisher, but she did manage to complete all four runs.

References 

 Argentina NOC participant list

Nations at the 2006 Winter Olympics
2006
Winter Olympics